Brian Hill may refer to:

Arts and entertainment
 Brian Hill (drummer) (fl. 2001–06), American drummer in the bands The Plot to Blow Up the Eiffel Tower and The Soft Pack
 Brian Hill (director) (fl. 2002–05), British film and television director
 Brian Hill (bassist) (fl. 2004–09), American bass player for The Postmarks
 Brian Hill (chef) (fl. 2006–10), American contestant on the reality television program Top Chef
 Brian Hill (author) (fl. 2006 and after), Canadian actor, director and writer

Politics and law
 Brian Hill (diplomat) (1919–1998), Australian ambassador
 Brian Hill (Ohio politician) (fl. 2011 and after), American state legislator in the Ohio House of Representatives
 Brian Hill (Oklahoma politician), American politician, member of the Oklahoma House of Representatives

Sports

Association football (soccer)
 Brian Hill (footballer, born 1937) (1937–1968), English footballer (Sheffield Wednesday)
 Brian Hill (footballer, born 1941) (1941–2016), English footballer (Coventry City)
 Brian Hill (footballer, born 1942) (born 1942), English footballer (Grimsby Town)
 Brian Hill (referee) (born 1947), English football referee

Other sports
 Brian Hill (basketball) (born 1947), American basketball coach
 Brian Hill (ice hockey) (born 1957), Canadian ice hockey player
 Brian Hill (swimmer) (born 1982), Canadian Paralympic swimmer
 Brian Hill (American football) (born 1995), American football running back

Others
 Brian Hill (businessman), Canadian entrepreneur
 Brian W. Hill, British historian

See also 
 Brian Hills (born 1959), Canadian ice hockey coach and former player
 Brian Andrew Hills (1934–2006), Welsh physiologist
 Bryan Hill (disambiguation)
 Hill (surname)